Sean Kelly may refer to:

Sports
 Sean Kelly (cyclist) (born 1956), Irish professional road bicycle racer
 Sean Kelly (Scottish footballer) (born 1993), Scottish footballer  (St. Mirren FC, AFC Wimbledon)
 Seán Kelly (Galway Gaelic footballer) (born 1997)
 Seán Kelly (Kerry Gaelic footballer) (1925–2012)
 Sean Dylan Kelly (born 2002), American motorcycle racer
 Sean Kelley (sportscaster), American sportscaster
 Sean Wirtz (born 1979), figure skater who has competed as Sean Kelly

Music
 Sean Kelly (Australian musician) (born 1958), founder of the Australian 1980s band Models
 Sean Kelly, Australian guitarist and member of TISM between 1983 and 1991 
 Sean Kelly (Canadian musician), founder of band Crash Kelly   
 Sean Kelly, singer and guitarist for The Samples

Other
 Seán Kelly (Irish politician) (born 1952), Irish Member of the European Parliament
 Sean Kelly (Irish republican) (born 1972), IRA Shankill Road bomber
 Sean Kelly (writer) (born 1940), Canadian author, wrote for National Lampoon
 Sean Dorrance Kelly, professor of philosophy at Harvard University
 Sean Kelly Gallery in New York
 Sean Kelly, stand up comedian and presenter of the television series Storage Hunters
 Sean Kelly, New Zealand fashion designer who won Project Runway season 13

See also
 Shaun Kelly (born 1988), English footballer
 Shaun P. Kelly (born 1964), American politician in Massachusetts
 Shawn Kelley (born 1984), baseball player
 Shawn Kelly, animator